Canon ELPH may refer to:
Canon Digital IXUS series, sold as the PowerShot Digital ELPH in US and Canada
Canon ELPH (series)
Canon ELPH (camera), introduced in 1996